Myclobutanil is a triazole chemical used as a fungicide. It is a steroid demethylation inhibitor, specifically inhibiting ergosterol biosynthesis. Ergosterol is a critical component of fungal cell membranes.

Stereoisomerism

Safety  
The Safety Data Sheet indicates the following hazards:
Suspected of damaging fertility or the unborn child.
Toxic to aquatic life with long lasting effects.
The first hazard has caused this chemical to be placed on the 1986 California Proposition 65 toxics list.

When heated, myclobutanil decomposes to produce corrosive and/or toxic fumes, including carbon monoxide, carbon dioxide, hydrogen chloride, hydrogen cyanide, and nitrogen oxides.

Banned for cannabis cultivation 
Myclobutanil is banned in Canada, Colorado, Washington, Oregon, and Oklahoma for the production of medical and recreational cannabis. In 2014, a Canadian news investigation by The Globe and Mail reported the discovery of myclobutanil in medical cannabis produced by at least one government licensed grower. In September 2019, NBC News commissioned CannaSafe to test THC cartridges for heavy metals, pesticides, and residual solvents like Vitamin E; pesticides, including myclobutanil, was found in products from unlicensed dealers. In Michigan, the current state action limit for myclobutanil is 200 ppb in cannabis products.

References

External links
 
 International Programme on Chemical Safety

Fungicides
Triazoles